The infraglenoid tubercle is the part of the scapula from which the long head of the triceps brachii muscle originates. The infraglenoid tubercle is a tubercle located on the lateral part of the scapula, inferior to (below) the glenoid cavity. The name infraglenoid tubercle refers to its location below the glenoid cavity.

Function 
The infraglenoid tubercle is the origin of the long head of the triceps brachii muscle. It helps to stabilise the muscle origin.

Additional images

See also
 Supraglenoid tubercle

References

External links

  - "Axillary Region: Scapula (Left)"
 

Scapula